Jarrard is a surname. Notable people with the surname include:

Kyle Jarrard (1955- ), American novelist, historian and editor
John Jarrard (1953–2001), American country songwriter
Levi D. Jarrard (1824–1886), American businessman and politician
Rick Jarrard, American record producer
Ted Jarrard (born 1922), Australian rules footballer
Joey Jarrard (born 1977), Bilateral Amputee and survivor of Bacterial Meningitis